The Cleveland Saints were a professional indoor football team based in Warrensville Heights, Ohio. The Saints were members of American Indoor Football (AIF). The club was established in 2014 as an expansion team for the 2015 season. The Saints played their home games at the Multiplex.

History

On July 31, 2014, it was announced that the Saints would be taking over the Cleveland Territory from the Cleveland Patriots, who didn't finish the 2014 season. The Saints began the season 0-5 then was taken over by new head coach and owner Marcus McIntosh whom change the team name to the Cleveland Pack. Despite changing owners and team name Marcus McIntosh finish the season with the same core of players.

The Saints were mentioned as members of Supreme Indoor Football in 2016, and again in the Can-Am Indoor Football League in 2017, but did not play any games either year.

Roster

Head coaches

Statistics and records

Season-by-season results
Note: The finish, wins, losses, and ties columns list regular season results and exclude any postseason play.

References

External links
 Official website

 
2014 establishments in Ohio
2015 disestablishments in Ohio